Sonja Kristina  (born Sonia Christina Shaw; 14 April 1949) is an English singer, best known for starring in the original London production of the seminal 1960s musical Hair, and for being the lead vocalist of the 1970s progressive rock band Curved Air.

Kristina is also an experienced voice coach. She was the Rock, Jazz and Musical Theatre tutor for Performing Arts Students at Middlesex University from 1991 to 1999.

Biography
Kristina was born in Brentwood as Sonia Christina Shaw, daughter of a criminologist and granddaughter of Swedish actress Gerda Lundequist.

Career
Kristina first appeared on stage at the Swan Folk Club in Romford at the age of thirteen. Her first professional gig was at a Folk Festival in Southgate, London a year or so later. By 1968, while studying at the New College of Speech and Drama, Kristina was helping to run, and performing at, the Wednesday evening sessions at London's Troubadour Folk Club. She was generally known on the folk scene as "Sonja" having previously appeared several times on the British children's TV show Song and Story under that name. Her first manager was Roy Guest of Folk Directions.

In 1968, Kristina auditioned for and won the part of "Crissy" in the London stage production of the stage musical Hair. She features on the original cast album singing the song "Frank Mills", also released as a single. She also briefly sang with The Strawbs, following the departure of Sandy Denny. Dave Cousins remembered:  Cousins eventually published the book, called The Bruising of Hearts, The Losing of Races, in 1993. It included a poem "Silver Smile", written for Kristina in the late 1960s.

Curved Air
According to AllMusic, it was Galt McDermott, who wrote the music for Hair and another musical Who the Murderer Was, who employed the four members of Curved Air as a house band, who suggested when the stage show closed that they add Kristina to the line-up. Another version has it that manager Mark Hanau had the idea Kristina's alto  vocals could become a vital ingredient in a new band. On 1 January 1970, the singer received an official invitation to become a member of Curved Air. She remembered sitting backstage on the theatre stairs listening to a cassette of the band's music Hanau had given her, and being much impressed. Described by Sting as a "real beauty, otherworldly and unattainable", Kristina played a full creative role bringing with it a powerful female sexuality. Her experiences working as a croupier in the London Playboy Club during the early 1970s, reflected itself in the stage persona she later developed.

Curved Air had a changing line-up over their nine albums (1970–1976 and 1990), with Kristina being the only constant element. Since 2008, she has taken part in a series of Curved Air reunion concerts.
She was romantically involved with Curved Air drummer Stewart Copeland, they were married from 1982 to 1991.

After Curved Air, she returned to Hair. She has also performed solo, including as part of the acid folk movement in London in the early 1990s, culminating in her critically acclaimed Songs from the Acid Folk in 1991, and in a multi-media duo MASK, with Marvin Ayres.

In 2008, Curved Air was reformed with other original members including Darryl Way and Florian Pilkington-Miksa and, later, Kirby Gregory from the Air Cut line up. The band continues to record and perform internationally.
Sonja Kristina has arrived on stage. Suddenly there is no band, no stage, no college kids. Just Sonja glinting in the green light. She moves like smoke across the stage, hardly seeming to move at all, but underdulating in slow motion. Who cares what the band is doing? As a muso I've never bothered with singers, considering them to be musical passengers/ How wrong I've been! She's not even singing yet, and she owns everything.

– Stewart Copeland

Theatre productions

Including the London version of the musical  Hair (1968), Kristina has performed in numerous theatre and musical theatre productions from the early 1960s onwards, including East Lynne (1966), a lead role in Romeo and Juliet, The French Have a Song For It (1979) with Helen Shapiro, Man to Woman with Marsha Hunt (1982), and Shona

Television
 'Curriculee, Curricula' (BBC TV 22 May 1978) with Dave Greenslade

Awards
In 1971, Kristina received the Sounds magazine Top Female Vocalist Award, and in 2014 the 'Guiding Light Award' at the Progressive Music Awards. The award was presented by television broadcaster, and long-standing Curved Air fan, Katie Puckrik for helping pave the way for other female artists who followed, including Kate Bush, Heather Findlay, Anne-Marie Helder and others.

Discography
Hair (Original London Cast Recording) 1968

Albums with Curved Air
 Air Conditioning (1970)
 Second Album (1971)
 Phantasmagoria (1972)
 Air Cut (1973)
 Live (1975)
 Midnight Wire (1975)
 Airborne (1976)
 The Best of Curved Air (1976) – compilation
 Lovechild (recorded 1973, released 1990)
 Live at the BBC (1995)
 Alive, 1990 (2000)
 Masters from the Vaults
 Reborn (2008)
 Retrospective (2010) – compilation including three MASK tracks
 North Star (2014)
 Tapestry Of Propositions (2016)
 The Second British Rock Meeting 1972 (2018)
 Live At Under The Bridge - The 45th Anniversary Concert (2019)

Albums as Sonja Kristina
 Sonja Kristina (1980)
 "Street Run" (Sonja Kristina, Alfie Agius)
 "Man He Colour" (Kristina, Agius)
 "Colder Than a Rose In Snow" (Paul Travis, Norma Tager)
 "Breaking Out In Smiles" (Kristina, Tager)
 "Mr Skin" (J. Ferguson)
 "Roller Coaster" (Kristina)
 "Full Time Woman" (Travis, Tager)
 "The Comforter" (Kristina)
 "St. Tropez" (Kristina, Paul Rudolf, Tager)
 "Fade Away" (Roy Hill)
 Songs from the Acid Folk (1991) (with TY-LOR and friends)
 All songs by Sonja Kristina except as shown
 "Anna"
 "Devil may care"
 "Melinda more or less"
 "Man he Colour"
 "This is not a Sanctuary"
 "Colder than a Rose" (Norma Tager and Paul Travers)
 "If this was Love"
 "Rollercoaster"
 "One to One"
 "Buccaneer"
 "Who was Hunter"
 "Citadel"
 Harmonics of Love (1995) (with Cloud 10)
 "Tropical Birth" (Cloud 10) 1.57
 "Angel" (Sonja Kristina, Cloud 10) 5.41
 "Sounds of Sea" 0.57
 "Heart of Glass" (Kristina) 4.26
 "Marimbas/Lullaby" 1.51
 "Baby Song" (Kristina) 4.23
 "Woman's Heart" (E. McEvoy) 4.17
 "Divine Cloud Space" (Robert Norton) 1.56
 "Birdsong" 1.03
 "Elfin Boy" (Kristina) 5.10
 "Glastonbury Dawn" 1.35
 "Blindman"(Kristina) 3.02
 "Dreamers" (lyric A. O'Shaughnessy, music Kristina) 5.19
 "Chant/Voices" 1.12
 "Remember Yourself" (Norton) 2.20
 Cri De Coeur (2003)
 "Don't Explain" (Billie Holiday, Arthur Herzog Jnr) 5.50
 "Lullaby" (Gian-Carlo Menotti) 2.51
 "Round Midnight" (Thelonious Monk, Cootie Williams) 5.49
 "Solitude" (Duke Ellington, Eddie de Lange) 5.15
 "Love for Sale" (Cole Porter) 4.53
 "Patterns" (Hard Maltby Jnr, David Shire) 3.52
 "Every Time We Say Goodbye" (Cole Porter) 2.50
 "Unworthy of Your Love" (Stephen Sondheim) 5.18
 "Skylark" (Hoagy Carmichael, Johnny Mercer) 4.15
 "I Have Nothing" (Linda Thompson, David Foster) 4.24
 "I'd Give My Life For You" (Claude-Michel Schonberg, Maltby Jr, Alain Boublil) 4.03
 "Cry Me a River" (Arthur Hamilton) 5.23
 "Petit Cri" (Marvin Ayres) 1.04
 "Reprise – Every Time We Say Goodbye" 1.07 
 Heavy Petal CD + DVD by MASK featuring Sonja Kristina (2005)
 All Songs by Marvin Ayres and Sonja Kristina except as shown
 Side One (CD)
 "Dark Murmur" (Ayres) 2.15
 "Global Incantation" 4.22
 "Paean" 2.51
 "Fall So Hard" (Ayres) 5.10
 "Healing Senses" 4.18
 "Blue Words" 5.04
 "Shelter Skelter" 3.28
 "Free" 5.44
 "Sliding Universe" (Ayres) 1.52
 "Lambent Spire" 6.42
 "Beloved" 4.06
 "Living Inside My Head" (Ayres) 3.25
 "Waking the Dream" 4.56
 "Sound of Tears Forming" (Ayres) 1.56
 "Those Ghosts" (Kristina) 3.29
 Side Two (DVD)
 "Free" 5.47
 "Lambent Spire" 6.42
 "Healing Senses" 10.36

Singles
 "It Happened Today" (1971)
 "Back Street Luv" (1971)
 "St. Tropez" (1980)
 "Walk on By/O Fortuna" (1985)
 "Waking with Dream" (1985)

Other recordings
 Vampires Stole My Lunch Money by Mick Farren (1978) – Sonja Kristina and The Pretenders' Chrissie Hynde provided backing vocals on this album.
 Sheep In Wolves' Clothing Motorheadbangers fan club tribute CD (2008) – Kristina contributed an acoustic version of Motörhead's "I Don't Believe A Word."
 Narration in Alice in Wonderland by german progressive rock band Neuschwanstein. Re-released on 4 November 2022

Personal life
Kristina married in 1971 and again to Stewart Copeland in 1982, with whom she had two sons. Copeland also adopted her son from a previous relationship. She became acquainted with Copeland while he was first road manager and then drummer for Curved Air (1974–1976). They divorced in 1991.

References

External links

Official website
Sonja Kristina bio at Curved Air website
About MASK at Reverbnation.com

1949 births
Living people
Curved Air members
English rock singers
Women rock singers
People from Brentwood, Essex
English people of Swedish descent
20th-century English women singers
20th-century English singers
21st-century English women singers
21st-century English singers
Strawbs members